Marius Madsen (1896 or 1897 – 28 June 1982) was a Danish trade union leader.

Madsen came to prominence in the Danish Brewery, Distillery and Mineral Water Workers' Union, and was elected as its president in 1926.  He was soon elected to the executive committee of the International Union of Food and Allied Workers (IUF), and in 1949, he was elected as president of the IUF.  The headquarters of the IUF were relocated to Copenhagen, and he built a strong working relationship with IUF general secretary Juul Poulsen.  Together, they rebuilt the membership of the federation, which had declined during World War II.  They attracted new affiliates from North and South America, and across Europe.  Madsen proposed a merger with the International Landworkers' Federation, which took place in 1960.

Madsen left his international role in 1958, and retired as president of his union in 1962.  He died twenty years later.

References

1890s births
1982 deaths
Danish trade union leaders